The Eisner Award for Best Anthology Shot is an award for "creative achievement" in American comic books. It has been given out every year since 1992.

Winners and nominees

Notes

References

Category
1993 establishments in the United States
Annual events in the United States
Awards established in 1993
Comics awards
Eisner Award winners for Best Anthology